The 56th Uddeholm Swedish Rally, second round of the 2007 World Rally Championship season took place between 9 and 11 February 2007.



Results

Retirements
  Jimmy Joge - gearbox problems (SS2);
  Xavier Pons - went off the road (SS5);
  Petter Solberg - retired to preserve the car (SS12);
  Aleksandr Dorosinski - engine problems (SS15);
  Matthew Wilson - engine problems (SS16/17);
  Jari-Matti Latvala - gearbox problems (SS16/17);
  Mark Higgins - went off the road (SS18);
  Martin Prokop - technical problems after tire puncture (SS19);
  Juan Pablo Raies - excluded (after the event);
  Juho Hänninen - excluded (after the event);

Special Stages
All dates and times are CET (UTC+1).

Championship standings after the event

Drivers' championship

Manufacturers' championship

References

External links
 Results on official site - WRC.com
 Results on eWRC-results.com
 Results on RallyBase.nl

Sweden
2007
Rally